The DK1 Platforms, abbreviated from cụm Dịch vụ kinh tế - Khoa học kỹ thuật, are a collection of offshore platforms built by Vietnam in the southern continental shelf of the country in the South China Sea. The rigs are complex steel structures composed of logistics and living facilities, manned by Vietnam People's Navy personnel.

Background
In response to the PRC's expansion into the South China Sea (SCS), in the mid 1980s, the Socialist Republic of Vietnam predicted the need for it to protect itself.  This led to the planning of, and in 1989, establishment of, the first DK1 rig.

Rig locations

DK1 rigs have been established in seven localities in the southwest of the Spratly Archipelago and on the south of Vietnam's continental shelf at:
 Bãi cạn Tư Chính - Vanguard Bank
 Bãi cạn Phúc Tần - Prince of Wales Bank
 Bãi ngầm Ba Kè - Bombay Castle
 Bãi cạn Phúc Nguyên - Prince Consort Bank
 Bãi cạn Huyền Trân - Alexandra Bank
 Bãi cạn Quế Đường - Grainger Bank
 Bãi cạn Cà Mau - Off the Cà Mau peninsula, the southernmost part of Vietnam.

Rigs 
A total of 20 rigs have been built on the continental shelf in waters of depth from 7m (DK1/3) to 25m (DK1/15), from 1989 to 1998. Currently (2015) there are a total of 15 rigs in use.  Facilities include 8 helicopter pads, 4 lighthouses, and a meteorological observatory.  There are 14 rigs in the Spratly Islands, and one (DK1/10) in Ca Mau Shoals off the southwest coast of Vietnam.

Vanguard Bank
The current (2015) cluster has 3 rigs in use.
 DK1/1: Completed 27 June 1989, is the 3rd construction.  Currently not used.
 DK1/5: Completed 2 November 1989, is the 4th rig built.  Currently not used.
 DK1/11: Completed 5 May 1994.
 DK1/12: Completed 8 August 1994.
 DK1/14: Completed 20 April 1995.

Prince of Wales Bank
The current (2015) cluster has 4 rigs in use. 
 DK1/3: Completed 15 June 1989, was the first rig completed.  It collapsed on the night of 4 December 1990 during a heavy storm.
 DK1/2: Completed 18 August 1993.
 DK1/16: Completed 20 August 1996.
 DK1/17: Completed 23 August 1996.
 DK1/18: Completed 13 April 1997. This rig includes a lighthouse.

Rifleman Bank
The current (2015) cluster has 3 rigs in use. 
 DK1/4: Completed 16 June 1989, is the 2nd rig completed. It collapsed on the night of 4 December 1990 during a heavy storm. 
 DK1/9: Completed 22 August 1993.
 DK1/20: Completed 13 August 1998. 
 DK1/21: Completed 19 August 1998. This rig includes a lighthouse.

Prince Consort Bank
The current (2015) cluster has 1 rig in use.
 DK1/6: Completed 10 November 1990, is the 5th frame completed. It collapsed on the night of 4 December 1990 during a heavy storm. 
 DK1/15: Completed in April 1995. 
 2A/DK1/6: Was completed 17 April 1995 using the foundations of the old DK1/6 rig.  It collapsed during a storm on 13 December 1998.

Alexandra Bank
The current (2015) cluster has 1 rig in use. 
 DK1/7: Completed 11 November 1991. Includes a lighthouse and a meteorological observatory.

Grainger Bank
The current (2015) cluster has 2 rigs in use.  
 DK1/8: Completed 4 November 1991. Includes a lighthouse. 
 DK1/19: Completed 10 April 1997.

Ca Mau Shoals
The current (2015) cluster has 1 rig in use.
 DK1/10: Completed in 1994.

Summary

See also
List of maritime features in the Spratly Islands
:vi:DK1

References

External links
 NGA chart 93049 showing Rifleman, Southwest and Vanguard Banks, (7-9N,109-112E), oceangrafix.com
 Larger scale charts also showing Vietnam coast: NGA chart 93020 (7-10N,104-110E), NGA chart 93030 (9-16N,105-116E), oceangrafix.com   
DK1/10 at sunset, www.scribd.com
 DK1 rigs photo gallery, hoangsa.org 
 Vanguard Bank 
 Prince of Wales Bank 
 Bombay Castle 
 Prince Consort Bank 
 Alexandra Bank 
 Grainger Bank 
 Cà Mau 
Google Images search of "nhà giàn dk1"

Spratly Islands